Gneeveguilla,, officially Gneevgullia, is a small village in the Sliabh Luachra region of East County Kerry, Ireland.

Location
Gneeveguilla is situated in a region of hills and valleys and serves a rural hinterland consisting of dairy farms, pastureland and peatland. Townlands in the area include Coom (Lower and Upper), Bawnard, Gullaun, Mausrower and Lisheen. At Mausrower, there used to be a large quarry in the early part of the 20th century, the remnants of which can be seen today on the approach from the Killarney direction towards Lower Coom. Hence the junction at Lower Coom being known as the Quarry Cross.

History
In the 19th century Gneeveguilla was the scene of an event known as the 'Moving Bog'. On the night of Sunday 28 December 1896, after a prolonged period of bad weather, sleeping families were awakened by an unusual sound. It followed the course of the Ownachree river into the river Flesk. The bog continued to move until New Year's Day and came to rest covering hundreds of acres of pastureland. The Moving Bog claimed the lives of 8 members of one local family.

The Church of the Holy Rosary is a Roman Catholic church in Gneeveguilla opened on 10 October 1937. It is one of three churches in the Rathmore Parish of the Diocese of Kerry.

Education
Gneeveguilla National School is a Catholic, co-educational school in the center of Gneevguilla, directly across from the GAA pitch and athletics center.

Music and culture
Several exponents of the 'Sliabh Luachra style' of traditional Irish music come from the Gneeveguilla area, including fiddler players Julia Clifford, Denis Murphy and Johnny and Paddy Cronin; and button accordion player Johnny O'Leary.

There is a statue in the village in honour of the Sliabh Luachra seanchaí (storyteller) Éamon Kelly (1914–2001).

Sports
Gneeveguilla is home to Gneeveguilla AC. Established in 1978, it has had success in both local Kerry Athletics and at national Level.

Gneeveguilla GAA is the local GAA club which plays in the East Kerry GAA division. Gneeveguilla is home to Ambrose O'Donovan, a former captain of the Kerry senior football team which won the 'Centenary All-Ireland' All-Ireland Senior Football Championship. Gneeveguilla won the Kerry Intermediate Football Championship in 2010, beating Finuge in the final in Austin Stack park in Tralee. They then went on to win the Munster Championship and lost the All-Ireland semi-final to St.James of County Galway, after a period of extra time.

Development
In Kerry County Council's "South East Kerry Settlements Local Area Plan 2008-2015", a number of opportunities for the future development of Gneeveguilla were identified. The plan recommended against scattered and ribbon development, as well as environmental and pedestrian safety improvements.

Notable people
 Julia Clifford (1914–1997), traditional musician.
 Paddy Cronin (1925–2014), fiddler.
 Eamon Kelly (1914–2001), actor and storyteller.
 Denis Murphy (1910–1974), traditional musician.
 Liam Murphy, Gaelic footballer.
 Ambrose O'Donovan (b.1962), Gaelic footballer.
 Charlie McCarthy, Gaelic footballer.
 Aogán Ó Rathaille (c.1670–1726), poet born at Scrahanaveal near Gneeveguilla.
 Eoghan Rua Ó Súilleabháin (1748–1782), poet.

See also
 List of towns and villages in Ireland

References

Towns and villages in County Kerry